Jeon Bae-soo (Korean: 전배수, born 2 June 1970) is a South Korean theatre, film and television actor. He is known for his supporting roles in various TV series and films. His better known works are: 2016 TV series The K2, 2019 romantic comedy When the Camellia Blooms, 2020 historical romantic comedy Mr. Queen and Netflix horror web series All of Us Are Dead. He has appeared in more than 50 TV series, theatrical plays and films including 2022 political drama film Kingmaker. In 2022, he appeared in TV series Tracer and Forecasting Love and Weather.

Career
Jeon Bae-soo debuted as an actor in films in 2004, taking small roles. His major breakthrough was in 2016  with roles in the TV series The K2 and Becky's Back. After that in 2017 he appeared in both seasons of  Stranger, Fight for My Way, Witch at Court Mad Dog, and Revolutionary Love. In 2020 he was cast in historical romantic comedy Mr. Queen.

In 2022 Jeon was seen in action thriller TV series Tracer, Netflix original series All of Us Are Dead, JTBC's work place romance Forecasting Love and Weather, KBS's sports drama Love All Play and legal drama Strange Lawyer Woo Young-woo alongside Park Eun-bin. In 2022, he also played role of director Lee's assistant in political drama film Kingmaker. 

In January 2023, Jeon signed with Noon Company.

Filmography

Films

Television series

Theater

Awards and nominations

References

External links

 Official website
 
 Jeon Bae-soo on Play DB
 Jeon Bae-soo on KMDb
 Jeon Bae-soo on Daum 
 

21st-century South Korean male actors
South Korean male television actors
South Korean male film actors 
Living people
1970 births
South Korean stage actors